Walter Harper (1893–1918) was an Alaska Native mountain climber and guide.

Walter Harper may also refer to:

 Walt Harper (1926–2006), American jazz pianist and nightclub owner
 Walter Harper (businessman) (1880–1956), Australian agriculturalist
 Walter Harper (priest) (1848–1930), former Dean of Christchurch

See also
 Walter Harper North (1871–1952), American jurist
 Harper (name)